Hopewell is an unincorporated community in Franklin Township, Johnson County, Indiana.

Geography

References

Unincorporated communities in Johnson County, Indiana
Unincorporated communities in Indiana
Indianapolis metropolitan area